MRJ, Mrj or mrj may refer to:

 Mitsubishi Regional Jet
 Mac OS Runtime for Java
 Movement for Reform Judaism
 Miraj Junction railway station code
 Hill Mari language, ISO 639 code